Giuseppe Abbiati was an Italian engraver, active during the beginning of the 18th century in Milan. He etched some small prints of battles, and allegorical subjects of his own design.

References

Italian engravers
18th-century Italian people
Year of death unknown
Year of birth unknown